Edyr de Castro (2 September 1946 – 15 January 2019) was a Brazilian actress and singer. She initially signed her original name, but later took on the stage name Edyr Duqui.

She was one of the members of the vocal group As Frenéticas, and was also member of the group Mucamas do Painho, derived from her participation in the program Chico Anysio Show.

She was married to singer and composer Zé Rodrix.

Works

Television 
 2009 - Poder Paralelo - Rosa Nunes
 2007 - Amor e Intrigas - Donata
 2007 - Sete Pecados - saleswoman of a stand near the school
 2006 - Sinhá Moça - Ruth
 2004 - Cabocla - Maria
 2003 - Agora É que São Elas - Guadalupe
 2000 - A turma do Pererê
 1997 - Por Amor - Elvira
 1992 - Anos Rebeldes
 1985 - Roque Santeiro - Nininha
 1976 - Escrava Isaura - Ana

 Film 
 2006 - Forbidden to Forbid - Rosalinda
 2002 - Something in the Air - Neusa
 1996 - The Barber of Rio - Patricia

 Theater 
 1969 – Hair''

See also 
 Brazilian television
 Música popular brasileira

References

External links 
 

1946 births
2019 deaths
Brazilian actresses
20th-century Brazilian women singers
20th-century Brazilian singers
Musicians from Rio de Janeiro (city)